Peridermium is a genus of rust fungi in the family Cronartiaceae.

The genus was circumscribed by Johann Carl Schmidt and Gustav Kunze in 1817.
Species include Peridermium californicum.

Subtaxa
Peridermium includes the following species and varieties:

Peridermium abietinum 
Peridermium abietinum var. abietinum 
Peridermium abietinum var. decolorans 
Peridermium acerifolium 
Peridermium acicola 
Peridermium acicolum 
Peridermium apocynaceum 
Peridermium appalachianum 
Peridermium balansae 
Peridermium balsameum 
Peridermium barteti 
Peridermium betheli 
Peridermium bethelii 
Peridermium boreale 
Peridermium boudieri 
Peridermium brevius 
Peridermium californicum 
Peridermium carneum 
Peridermium carpetanum 
Peridermium cedri 
Peridermium cerebroides 
Peridermium cerebrum 
Peridermium coloradense 
Peridermium columnare 
Peridermium complanatum 
Peridermium comptoniae 
Peridermium conigenum 
Peridermium conorum 
Peridermium conorum-piceae 
Peridermium consimile 
Peridermium cornui 
Peridermium corruscans 
Peridermium corticola 
Peridermium corui 
Peridermium decolorans 
Peridermium deformans 
Peridermium delicatulum 
Peridermium dieteli 
Peridermium dietelii 
Peridermium elatinum 
Peridermium elephantopi 
Peridermium elephantopodis 
Peridermium engelmanni 
Peridermium engelmannii 
Peridermium ephedrae 
Peridermium ephedrae 
Peridermium ephedricola 
Peridermium falciforme 
Peridermium filamentosum 
Peridermium fischeri 
Peridermium floridanum 
Peridermium fragile 
Peridermium fructigenum 
Peridermium fusiforme 
Peridermium germinale 
Peridermium giganteum 
Peridermium globosum 
Peridermium gracile 
Peridermium gracile 
Peridermium guatemalense 
Peridermium harknessii 
Peridermium helianthi 
Peridermium himalayense 
Peridermium holwayi 
Peridermium hydrangeae 
Peridermium inconspicuum 
Peridermium indicum 
Peridermium ingenuum 
Peridermium insulare 
Peridermium intermedium 
Peridermium ipomoeae 
Peridermium jaapii 
Peridermium japonicum 
Peridermium keteleeriae-evelynianae 
Peridermium klebahni 
Peridermium klebahnii 
Peridermium kosmahlii 
Peridermium kriegerii 
Peridermium krylowianum 
Peridermium kunmingense 
Peridermium kurilense 
Peridermium laricis 
Peridermium likiangense 
Peridermium likiangensis 
Peridermium loranthinum 
Peridermium magnusianum 
Peridermium magnusii 
Peridermium mexicanum 
Peridermium minutum 
Peridermium montanum 
Peridermium montezumae 
Peridermium oblongisporium 
Peridermium oblongisporium var. oblongisporium 
Peridermium oblongisporium var. ravenelii 
Peridermium oblongisporum 
Peridermium occidentale 
Peridermium orientale 
Peridermium ornamentale 
Peridermium parksianum 
Peridermium peckii 
Peridermium piceae 
Peridermium piceae-hondoensis 
Peridermium pini 
Peridermium pini 
Peridermium pini-densiflorae 
Peridermium pini-koraiensis 
Peridermium pini-thunbergii 
Peridermium pinicola 
Peridermium piriforme 
Peridermium plowrightii 
Peridermium praelongum 
Peridermium pseudo-balsameum 
Peridermium pseudobalsameum 
Peridermium pycnoconspicuum 
Peridermium pycnogrande 
Peridermium pyriforme 
Peridermium ravenelii 
Peridermium ribicola 
Peridermium rostrupii 
Peridermium rostrupii 
Peridermium rugosum 
Peridermium sinense 
Peridermium sinensis 
Peridermium soraueri 
Peridermium stahlii 
Peridermium stalactiforme 
Peridermium strobi 
Peridermium strobilinum 
Peridermium terebinthinaceae 
Peridermium thomsoni 
Peridermium thomsonii 
Peridermium truncicola 
Peridermium weirii 
Peridermium yamabense 
Peridermium yunshae 
Peridermium zilleri

References

External links

Teliomycotina